Hannah Yelland (born 1976) is a British-born actress now living and working in the United States.

Early life
Hannah Yelland was born in Hammersmith, west London, and brought up in Richmond, Surbiton and East Molesey. She is the daughter of British actor David Yelland. Yelland was educated at local state comprehensive schools, followed by St. Catharine's College at the University of Cambridge, where she studied English.

Career
She appeared onstage with her father, in a 2007/08 revival of The Life and Adventures of Nicholas Nickleby. Her other stage work includes starring as Laura in the Broadway production of Brief Encounter, for which she was nominated for a 2011 Tony Award for Best Leading Actress in a Play. 

In April 2012, Yelland made her debut at Dublin's Gate Theatre, appearing in the title role in My Cousin Rachel, in an adaptation by Joseph O'Connor. Most recently, she played Hermione in the critically acclaimed production of The Winter's Tale, directed by Rebecca Taichman for the McCarter Theatre, Princeton, and the Shakespeare Theatre Company, Washington DC.

Personal life
In August 2010, she married Michael Bahar, a U.S. Naval Officer and former Deputy Legal Advisor to the National Security Staff at the White House. The two divide their time between Washington DC and New York City.

Partial filmography
Catherine Cookson's The Secret (1999)
The Bill (1999)
A Touch of Frost (1999)
Agatha Christie's Poirot (Lord Edgware Dies, 2000)
Dinotopia (2002)
AKA (2002)
The Project (2002)
Ultimate Force (2005)
Dalziel and Pascoe (2006)
Father Brown The River Corrupted (2020) Episode 8.7

References

External links

English stage actresses
Alumni of St Catharine's College, Cambridge
1976 births
Living people
English film actresses
People from Hammersmith
British expatriates in the United States